Brent South was a constituency for the House of Commons of the UK Parliament; the areas of the constituency chiefly fell into the new Brent Central for the 2010 general election which was the date of its abolition. It elected one member (MP) by the first past the post system of election.

From its creation in 1974, the constituency consistently elected Labour MPs with large majorities. At the 2010 general election, Brent South was abolished and split between neighbouring Brent North and two newly created constituencies: Brent Central and Hampstead and Kilburn.

Boundaries 
1974–1983: The London Borough of Brent wards of Alperton, Barham, Chamberlayne, Harlesden, Kensal Rise, Manor, Roundwood, St Raphael's, Stonebridge, and Wembley Central

1983–1997: As above less Chamberlayne ward, plus Tokyngton ward

1997–2010: As above plus St Andrews ward

Constituency profile
Brent South was a constituency covering various suburban and inner city areas of Brent, namely Kensal Green, Harlesden (including Park Royal and Stonebridge), Neasden (southern part), Wembley (town centre, including Alperton, Tokyngton (from 1983) and southern Sudbury), and (from 1997) southern Kingsbury.

It is one of the most multicultural areas in the United Kingdom. The 1991 census revealed that 55.4% of the constituency was from an ethnic minority background, the second-highest figure in England at the time behind Birmingham Ladywood.

Members of Parliament

Election results

Elections in the 1970s

Elections in the 1980s

Elections in the 1990s

Elections in the 2000s

References

External links
 

Politics of the London Borough of Brent
Constituencies of the Parliament of the United Kingdom established in 1974
Constituencies of the Parliament of the United Kingdom disestablished in 2010
Parliamentary constituencies in London (historic)